The 1956–57 RPI Green Devils men's basketball team represented the Richmond Professional Institute (now Virginia Commonwealth University) in NCAA men's basketball during the 1956–57 NCAA University Division men's basketball season. The season was the first year in program history that the Green Devils posted a winning record. The Green Devils were coached by Ed Allen.

Roster 
The following players were part of the 1956/57 team.

 Jim Craven
 Milt Bailey
 Ed Peeples (co-captain)
 Jimmy Rogers
 Jerry Gholson
 John Tobin (co-captain)

References 

Rpi
VCU Rams men's basketball seasons
Rpi Green Devils men's basketball
Rpi Green Devils men's basketball